Dorney is a village and civil parish in the Unitary Authority of Buckinghamshire, England, bordering on the River Thames to the west and south, and bisected by the Jubilee River. In 2011 it had a population of 752.

It includes a grade I listed manor house, Dorney Court, as well as the largest rowing lake in the south of England, Dorney Lake. Altogether water accounts for 13% of Dorney, the highest proportion in Buckinghamshire.

History
Dorney Manor was mentioned in the Domesday book, and was famed for honey; it is named after the Saxon for "Island of Bees".
Dorney Court
Dorney Court adjoins the centre of the village and has comparable grounds to other village centre properties.  It was however the manor house so owned much of the land of the village until the late 18th century.  It dates to the early Tudor period, its listing states " 1500, altered", and is made from a timber frame with red brick rather than wattle and daub infill its tile roof has old original tiles.  It has bold star-shaped timbers and a large fireplace with panels from Faversham Abbey, Kent.

A social history account of its early history reveals the then adjoining Boveney manor at the southern extremity of the village of Burnham had a great oak tree cut down by an employee, saw revenge exacted by Dorney's employees, who the latter had placed in the 'stokkys', and this man who had the tree cut down defended his conduct by declaring that at a court, held by the Steward of the Honour of Wallingford in Buckinghamshire, fifteen honest men had found Dorney to be a royal manor and that the green was therefore common, as waste grounds, to the tenants dwelling nearby.  Thus it was legal to cut the tree down.

The ownership of the manor is summarised in its own article, but perhaps the most notable head of family was in 1542, on being bought by William Garrard, who was afterwards (1555-1556) Lord Mayor of London. Maj. C. H. D. Palmer owned it in 1925, having been passed down by earlier Palmers since 1624. Until after 1925, the manor's family owned the rectory, improved and kept up the church, a state of affairs which ended with the ending of all tithes in England and Wales.

Other History
Dorney Court is where the first pineapple in the UK was grown and so Dorney has a public house named The Pineapple, Grade II listed for its age, dating half to the 17th century and half to the 18th century.

In 1961 a cornfield at Dorney was the scene of a nationally reported abduction. A lone gunman, James Hanratty, abducted Valerie Storie and Michael Gregsten in a Morris Minor parked in the cornfield. He forced them at gunpoint to drive to a lay-by on the A6 at Maulden in Bedfordshire, where he shot and murdered Gregsten, raped Valerie Storie and shot her. She survived, paralysed.

Topography
The village is on the north bank of the River Thames on very gently sloping land towards the river and inchoate streams which were mostly joined into the Jubilee River, mainly on gravel-underlain soil.

Slough, which is linked by two roads forming a rectangle with Dorney, is  ENE.

Dorney has Dorney Lake, where alongside Holme Pierrepont in England major rowing events take place, such as at the 2012 Summer Olympics and annually in events such as the Wallingford, Marlow and Metropolitan Regattas.  The Olympic games also hosted canoeing events there which continue to take place occasionally.

In the south east Dorney Common is a large traditional grassed common, roughly triangular, which is an SSSI. Owing to the continued use of the land for grazing, the common offers panoramic views of Windsor Castle 2 and a half miles to the east.

Local administration
In local administration Dorney's community meets at a civil parish council for minor upkeep, community events and recreational matters and is surrounded to the south, east and west by the non-metropolitan county of Berkshire, with a narrow border along its north (with Taplow and Burnham) further towards the heart of Buckinghamshire.  This anomaly of forming a salient just like Iver dates to the Local Government Act 1972, which came into force on 1 April 1974 – the village had been originally included in Berkshire in its Bill, but an amendment to keep it in Buckinghamshire was proposed by local MP Ronald Bell and accepted by the government.

The village was in an area affected by a postal county anomaly, in that until the redundancy of these in 1996 under the Royal Mail national addressing system, Royal Mail ensured better delivery to write "Dorney [Buckinghamshire], WINDSOR, Berkshire, SL4...".  It is now acceptable to write instead the more correct "Dorney, WINDSOR, SL4...", or even "Dorney, WINDSOR, Buckinghamshire, SL4...".

Features
None of the properties in Dorney Reach are listed in terms of architecture, however a central cluster in the other, closer two parts of the village are, giving 15 in total.

Although the church was 'restored' so somewhat unrecognisable in terms of obscuring its medieval decoration (this took place in the 19th century), the chancel and nave date from the 12th century, the tower was built about 1540, and the north or Garrard chapel and the porch were added in the 17th century.

A second country house takes its name from the parish, but is just over its northeastern border, Dorneywood, which is in a high listed building category and which is used as home (and entertainment or state reception venue) for a senior member of the Government, usually a Secretary of State or other Minister of the Crown.

Transport
The village has no railway station.  A regular bus timetable operates to Windsor and Slough.

The village is partly bounded by the north by the M4 motorway where there is a junction just after the road north from the village meets the A4 Bath Road for Slough 'West'.  This access to London Heathrow Airport and the city itself and has meant that Dorney is since its construction accessible to city commuters as well as Thames Valley commuters.

Religion
A majority of the inhabitants in 2011 (62.8%) described themselves as Christian – if this is reflective of UK trends, and in the absence of a Roman Catholic church then likely this implies a sizeable majority are Anglican whether they attend church or not – its sole parish church is of this denomination and is dedicated to Saint James.  More than 2% of the population are Hindu, Muslim, Jewish and Buddhist.

Localities

Dorney Reach
Dorney Reach is a community on a riverside road, almost half of the homes of which are by the River Thames, overlooking Monkey Island. This side of the river is also the location of a Thames lock, named Bray Lock; its name is somewhat of a misnomer, as the village of Bray sits on the opposite side of the river from the lock itself.

Lake End
Lake End includes the Pineapple and is the only settled part north of the Jubilee River on the main northward road from the village, with a public car park by the Jubilee River which enables access to its towpath and the buildings of Dorney and Lake End.

Demography

Nearest places
 Burnham - 2 miles
 Taplow - 2 miles
 Eton - 2 miles
 Maidenhead - 4 miles

References

External links

Villages in Buckinghamshire
Civil parishes in Buckinghamshire
Populated places on the River Thames